The 1994 CONCACAF U-16 Championship was a North American international association football tournament, it determined the 1995 FIFA U-17 World Championship entrants from the CONCACAF region. The 1994 edition of the competition was held in El Salvador.

First round

Group 1

Group 2

Group 3

Final round

Canada, Costa Rica and USA qualified to the 1995 FIFA U-17 World Championship in Ecuador.

References 

CONCACAF Under-17 Championship
Under
International association football competitions hosted by El Salvador
CON
1994 in youth association football